is a former Japanese football player.

Playing career
Kobayashi was born in Gunma Prefecture on August 26, 1973. After graduating from high school, he joined the Japan Football League club NTT Kanto (later Omiya Ardija) in 1992. Although he did not play much at first, he played often in 1994. In 1999, he moved to the newly promoted J2 League club, Sagan Tosu. He played often as a side back and side midfielder over two seasons until 2000. In May 2001, he joined the J2 club Albirex Niigata. Although he did play much in 2001, he became a regular player as a right side back in 2002. He retired at the end of the 2002 season.

Club statistics

References

External links

Albirex Niigata

1973 births
Living people
Association football people from Gunma Prefecture
Japanese footballers
J2 League players
Japan Football League (1992–1998) players
Omiya Ardija players
Sagan Tosu players
Albirex Niigata players
Association football defenders